Pentamethylbenzene is an organic compound with the formula C6H(CH3)5.  It is a colourless solid with a sweet odor.  The compound is classified as an aromatic hydrocarbon.  It is a relatively easily oxidized benzene derivative, with E1/2 of 1.95 V vs NHE.

Synthesis and reactions
It is obtained as a minor product in the Friedel–Crafts methylation of xylene to durene (1,2,4,5-tetramethylbenzene). Like durene, pentamethylbenzene is rather electron-rich and undergoes electrophilic substitution readily.  Indeed, it is used as a scavenger for carbocations.

Pentamethylbenzene has been observed as an intermediate in the formation of hexamethylbenzene from phenol and alkylation of durene or pentamethylbenzene has been reported as a suitable starting material for the synthesis of hexamethylbenzene.

References

Hydrocarbon solvents
Alkylbenzenes
Sweet-smelling chemicals